Unit is an electronic musician based in New York City. Unit began releasing electronic music officially at the age of 25, although he had musical involvement for many years prior, playing bass guitar at 17, and began working on electronic music at the age of 18. Unit has toured at various venues in Europe .

Discography 

Hello ... My Name Is (CD, Maxi), Caipirinha Productions  1999
The Narcoleptic Symphony (CD), Caipirinha Productions  1999
Most Of Me Just Thinks It's Because You're Heartless (CDr), Co.Ad.Audio  2001
FT037. Imp. - Music To Fix My Boat By [12"] (11/2001)
I Came Here To Tell You How It's Going To Begin (CD), Co.Ad.Audio  2004
I Came Here To Tell You How It's Going To Begin (CD), Modulo  2004
Hello ... My Name Is (12"), Bohnerwachs Tontraeger  2005
The Narcoleptic Symphony (2xLP), Bohnerwachs Tontraeger  2005
The Narcoleptic Symphony / Hello... My Name Is (3x12"), Bohnerwachs Tontraeger 2005

Music Also Appears On:

Trax Sampler 025 (CD, Smplr) Ring Worm Trax Sampler  (1999)
Across The Cell Wall (CD) Untitled Kodama  (2000)
The Wire Tapper 4 (CD) Ring*worm Wire Magazine  (2000)
It Sounds Different - Sweet Electro (CD) Static Beef Different  (2002)
Crash Redevelopment (CD) Medicine is Using (Mag... Co.Ad.Audio  (2003)
WIDE Presents... (LP) Boloni Wider  (2005)
At The Controls (2xCD) Your Arrival Is Our Ar... Resist Music  (2007)

Aliases 
Unit
Mr. S. Pants
Dotman
Imp

Other activities 

Fleming is also a professional freelance graphic designer for various New York design firms and is an avid editorial cartoonist for The Brooklyn Paper.

External links 
Discogs.com Release History
"Most Of Me Just Thinks It's Because You're Heartless" at rateyourmusic.com
Cristian Fleming's Political Weblog
Brooklyn Paper Weekly

References 

1. 

Intelligent dance musicians
Breakbeat musicians
1974 births
Living people